Funoon TV is an Arabic-language comedy television channel based in Kuwait. It was founded by the late Kuwaiti actor Abdulhussain Abdulredha, who is its owner and director. It is the first Arabic-language television channel to specialise in the broadcast of comedy material.

Achievements channel

Since their launch they are achieving success continuum, and thus added more fame and luster and brilliance are distinct yet another offer the artist Abdul Hussain Abdul Rida, as it has done a great productive pumping big money in its sessions for the month of Ramadan and the production of a series and the work exclusive of the channel itself, such as:

 Fadfada 2006 
 Tricks, including 2007
 Not a word 2007 
 Tricks, including 2 in 2008 
 Taxi-hop 2008 
 Eyes eye 2008 
 My family 2008 
 Eyal Bo Salem 2008 
 University of nothing 2008
 Not a word 2, 2008 
 Tricks, including violin and violin 2009
 Not a word 3, 2009 
 Not a word children 2009
 Eye 2 eye 2009 
 Osnasid 2009 
 Colonel Shamma 2009 
 Moza and Weza 2009 
 Not a word challenge 2010

Politics Channel

The channel is set up comedy special programs, both programs were particularly original channel and another purchased.  And map programs include movies, comedy, ancient and modern, as it also includes the preparation of original software to group presentations comedy touch all aspects of our lives. Combine the original films, serials, comedies, current and classic Kuwait and the Persian Gulf and around the Arab world, as they show films with an unusual model of an unattended, thus ensuring a major attraction for lovers of the new comedy. Is the only channel devoted to make the viewer Arab and foreign expatriate laughs throughout the twenty-four hours seven days a week. The comedy channel and our house is the class of employers, families and youth, adolescents and children and all family

References

Arabic-language television stations